Live 1980 may refer to:
Devo Live 1980
Live 1980 (Sammy Hagar album)
Live 1980, Clarence "Gatemouth" Brown